William Rosado (born October 23, 1955) is an American wrestler. He competed in the men's freestyle 48 kg at the 1976 Summer Olympics. He also competed for the United States at the 1979 World Sambo Championships.

References

1955 births
Living people
American male sport wrestlers
American sambo practitioners
Olympic wrestlers of the United States
Wrestlers at the 1976 Summer Olympics
Sportspeople from Wiltshire
Pan American Games medalists in wrestling
Pan American Games gold medalists for the United States
Wrestlers at the 1979 Pan American Games
Medalists at the 1979 Pan American Games
20th-century American people
21st-century American people